Belp Steinbach railway station is a railway station in the municipality of Belp, in the Swiss canton of Bern. It is an intermediate stop on the standard gauge Gürbetal line of BLS AG.

Services 
The following services stop at Belp Steinbach:

 Bern S-Bahn:
 : rush-hour service between Biel/Bienne and Belp.

References

External links 
 
 

Railway stations in the canton of Bern
BLS railway stations